Alliance of the Centre (AdC), whose full name is Alliance of the Centre for the Territories, is a Christian-democratic political party in Italy.

It was founded in November 2008 as Alliance of the Centre for Freedom by splinters from the Union of the Centre (UdC) who wanted to return to an alliance with Silvio Berlusconi's centre-right coalition and support his fourth government. Its leader is Francesco Pionati, deputy and formerly spokesman of the UdC.

At the 2009 European Parliament election, AdC was part of The Autonomy, an electoral coalition including The Right, the Movement for the Autonomies and the Pensioners' Party, which gained 2.2% of the vote and no MEPs. In the 2010 general regional elections AdC ran its lists in a handful of regions, electing only one regional councillor in Pionati's homeregion, Campania (2.35%).
In the 2011 Molise regional election the party got the 6.73% of the vote and 2 seats in the Regional Council.

On 20 January 2011, AdC was a founding component of Responsible Initiative (later renamed People and Territory), a centre-right group in the Italian Chamber of Deputies during the 16th Legislature. In October 2012, the balance of accounts of the People of Freedom (PdL) showed that the Alliance of the Centre had received €80,000 of financial support from PdL.

The party was renamed Alliance of the Centre for the Territories in July 2019.

Leadership
Secretary: Francesco Pionati

External links
Official website
Official website of Francesco Pionati

References

Centrist parties in Italy
Christian democratic parties in Italy
Catholic political parties
The Autonomy
2008 establishments in Italy
Political parties established in 2008